Louisiana's 6th State Senate district is one of 39 districts in the Louisiana State Senate. It has been represented by Republican Bodi White since 2012.

Geography
District 6 snakes along a portion of Louisiana's Florida Parishes, including parts of East Baton Rouge Parish outside of Baton Rouge and smaller sections of Livingston, St. Helena, and Tangipahoa Parishes. The district covers some or all of Ponchatoula, Hammond, and Central, as well as a small part of Lake Pontchartrain.

The district overlaps with Louisiana's 1st, 5th, and 6th congressional districts, and with the 64th, 65th, 66th, 69th, 72nd, 73rd, 86th, and 95th districts of the Louisiana House of Representatives.

Recent election results
Louisiana uses a jungle primary system. If no candidate receives 50% in the first round of voting, when all candidates appear on the same ballot regardless of party, the top-two finishers advance to a runoff election.

2019

2015

2011

Federal and statewide results in District 6

References

Louisiana State Senate districts
East Baton Rouge Parish, Louisiana
Livingston Parish, Louisiana
St. Helena Parish, Louisiana
Tangipahoa Parish, Louisiana